Crash Tag Team Racing is a 2005 kart racing game developed by Vancouver-based Radical Entertainment and published by Vivendi Universal Games under the Sierra Entertainment label for the GameCube (GC), PlayStation 2 (PS2), Xbox, and the PlayStation Portable (PSP). The game was released in North America on October 19, 2005 and in Europe on November 4, 2005. The PlayStation 2 version was re-released in the three-disc "Crash Bandicoot Action Pack" compilation (alongside Crash Nitro Kart and Crash Twinsanity) in the United States on June 12, 2007 and in Europe on July 20, 2007. Crash Tag Team Racing is the third racing game in the Crash Bandicoot video game series, following Crash Nitro Kart.

The game's story centers on the exploits of the protagonist, Crash Bandicoot, who must win the ownership of a dilapidated theme park by finding its missing Power Gems before his nemesis, Doctor Neo Cortex, can.

Crash Tag Team Racing received generally mixed reviews; while its visual style, humor and supplementary content were generally praised, the racing mechanics and track designs were criticized for being uninspired, and the game's graphical quality was deemed to be inconsistent. Content from the game was later remastered as part of Crash Team Racing Nitro-Fueled, released on June 21, 2019.

Gameplay

The player takes control of Crash Bandicoot, who must retrieve the Black Power Gem of Ebenezer Von Clutch, along with the missing Power Gems in each of the five themed areas of the park. The player will compete in races and minigames to earn Wumpa Coins, the park's currency, and Power Crystals, find the Power Gem needed to open up the five areas of the park, and ultimately unveil the mystery of the Power Gem thief's identity.

As the player explores the park, platforming gates can be entered to unlock new platforming, Extra Wumpa Coins and Power Crystals can be earned by playing platforming, all of which involve platforming Characters with an icon over their heads can be talked to, to unlock cars, weapon upgrades, clothing, or to play minigames. The player can smash crates and collect Wumpa Coins in order to buy rewards such as new clothing; drinking Wumpa Whip gives the player a temporary coin multiplier that earns extra money from Wumpa Coins and crates. Collecting Power Crystals is required to unlock the Power Gem at the end of a themed area, which unlocks an additional area of the theme park. Mini-cartoons, called "Die-O-Ramas", can also be unlocked; these cutscenes display Crash being grievously injured or "killed" off in various, and largely humorous ways. Unlocking all 34 Die-O-Ramas unlocks another costume for Crash. The Die-O-Ramas can be viewed at any time under the Extras section in the main menu.

The main hook of Crash Tag Team Racing is the "clashing" feature found during the racing sections of the game. The player can "clash" with another vehicle by pressing a certain button depending on the gaming platform. The player's vehicle will merge with a nearby opponent's vehicle, and the player will then take control of a powerful turret weapon to shoot at other vehicles. The turret can not only be used to shoot at enemy cars, but also to take out incoming attacks.

Plot

Characters

Six returning characters from previous Crash titles star in Crash Tag Team Racing, along with five original characters. The player character and protagonist of the game, Crash Bandicoot, is an evolved bandicoot who must win each of the races in Von Clutch's MotorWorld and win the deed to the park before his foes can. Crash is allied by his sister Coco and friend Crunch. The main antagonist of the series, Doctor Neo Cortex, is a mad scientist who attempts to win the deed to the park and use it for his own evil purposes. Cortex is allied by his right-hand man Doctor N. Gin and his niece Nina.

The game introduces two new playable characters: Ebenezer Von Clutch, a deranged German cyborg, is the owner of MotorWorld, and must retrieve his Black Power Gem before he automatically turns off. Aiding him and the Bandicoots is Texan racecar driver Pasadena O'Possum. Additional non-player characters include the mysterious Willie Wumpa Cheeks, the park's excessively jolly mascot and source of Wumpa Whip; and Chick Gizzard Lips and Stew, two chicken race commentators who provide comic relief and serve as Crash's tutors during the game. Roaming around the park are numerous Park Drones, a group of miserable employees who will take a certain amount of money to give Crash what he needs, and various pedestrians, who seem just as disgruntled with the park as the Park Drones.

Story
Chick Gizzard Lips and Stew announce the farewell race of Von Clutch's MotorWorld, Ebenezer Von Clutch's auto-racing theme park, due to the theft of the Power Gems powering the park. The Black Power Gem powering Von Clutch's cyborg body is also missing, leaving him only hours left to live. By coincidence, Crash, Coco and Crunch Bandicoot crash into the park while escaping their foes Dr. Neo Cortex, his niece Nina, and Dr. N. Gin. Von Clutch recruits all six to search for the missing Power Gems, offering ownership of the park to whoever finds them, with Cortex plotting to use the park as a new base of operations. The group also meet Pasadena O'Possum, a professional racer hired by Von Clutch to find the Power Gems, and Willie Wumpa Cheeks, the park mascot and producer of its popular beverage "Wumpa Whip".

Crash finds and returns all the missing Power Gems, officially winning ownership of the park. Cortex, Coco and Pasadena suspect the true thief has been attempting to sabotage their efforts, noting a trail of Wumpa Whip at the scene of every Power Gem theft. Crash is initially suspected due to his heavy consumption of the drink, but an irritated Willie reveals himself to be the culprit. With the Black Power Gem in his possession, Willie flees to Astro Land and prepares to escape into outer space through Astro Land's largest rocket. The heroes give chase, while Von Clutch finally runs out of power and shuts down. In Astro Land, Willie prepares to launch the rocket, but Crash pulls a nearby lever that aborts the launch. Before they can interrogate Willie about the Black Power Gem's location, Cortex and his team appear in their own ship and shoot Willie, liquefying him. Cortex prepares to kill the Bandicoots, but Crash tosses a chicken into the ship's main rotor, causing it to malfunction, and Cortex swears vengeance as he retreats.

The Bandicoots are presented the deed to the park, but Coco decides it should be returned to Von Clutch, though due to the loss of the Black Power Gem, Pasadena confirms Von Clutch will remain deactivated. Crash accidentally finds the Black Power gem in the Wumpa Whip from Willie's remains while attempting to drink it. He revives Von Clutch, who gives the Bandicoots free lifetime passes to the park in gratitude. Crash pats Von Clutch on the back, inadvertently ejecting the Black Power Gem and deactivating Von Clutch again. Fearing he has accidentally killed Von Clutch, Crash hops in one of the cars and drives away.

Development
Željko Duvnjak served as the conceptual artist for Crash Tag Team Racing. The story, all new characters and game script/dialogue were created by animation producer and director Jordan Reichek of Perky Pickle Studios. He was assisted by Chris Mitchell of Radical Games. Reichek based the story on a twisted hybrid story of Walt Disney's Disneyland theme park and a Scooby-Doo-type mystery. Reichek was brought into the game production as writer and creative consultant by Vivendi Universal after his successful involvement with the previous Crash Bandicoot title, Crash Twinsanity, where he offered similar creative direction. The full-motion videos were created by Red Eye Studios, who had previously animated the cutscenes for Crash Nitro Kart and Twinsanity. The environments of the game were built by Sarah Meagher and Vincent Chin, while the vehicles were built by Kevin Fink.

The game's soundtrack was composed by Marc Baril and Spiralmouth (the latter reprising their music role from Crash Twinsanity), with Michael Neilson providing additional music; Gabriel Mann of Spiralmouth doubled as the soundtrack's producer. A fifteen-track soundtrack was released on March 6, 2007, and is available in the iTunes Music Store. The sound design of the game was provided by Cory Hawthorne. The game's voice actors were cast and directed by Chris Borders at Technicolor Interactive Services. Lex Lang and Debi Derryberry reprised their respective roles as Dr. Cortex and Coco, while the roles of Crash, Crunch, N. Gin and Nina were inherited by Jess Harnell, Chris Williams, Nolan North and Amy Gross. The new characters Von Clutch, Pasadena and Willie were respectively voiced by Danny Mann, Shanelle Workman and Roger L. Jackson.

Reception

Crash Tag Team Racing received mixed reviews upon release. Matthew Fisher of TeamXbox commended the clashing mechanic as a great addition, as well as the variety of tracks and weapons. Alex Navarro of GameSpot concluded that "the racing isn't exactly the star of the show, but Crash Tag Team Racings supplemental elements pull the whole thing together into a unique and most enjoyable experience"; on the subject of the PSP version, Navarro added that the handheld version's loading times were "painful". Greg Ford and Kathleen Sanders of Electronic Gaming Monthly both dismissed the game as being for younger players and criticized the repetitive cycle of clearing the worlds and tracks, although Ford acknowledged that the disparate gameplay elements were inoffensively competent. Hector Guzman of GameSpy found the clashing mechanic to be amusing and entertaining, but derided the platforming camera for its "horrific clumsiness". Justin Speer of G4 felt that while the platforming and racing elements were decent, the game was short and shallow. Karl Castaneda of Nintendo World Report condemned the bland races, lack of variety in weapons and vehicles, and the presence of fetch-quests in a racing game, though he considered the stunt mode to be entertaining. The low difficulty was criticized, and the absence of online multiplayer play was lamented.

Critics positively summarized the game's graphics as cartoonish, colorful and well-animated, albeit less than impressive. Fisher, while voicing this sentiment, noted that "the overall look is only hampered by occasional bits of slowdown, and some lacking level design". Charles Onyett of IGN and Ellie Gibson of Eurogamer noted the high degree of detail and extra moving parts in the game's level design, though Gibson noticed that some areas were dimly lit, and Onyett criticized the lower graphical quality of the Die-O-Rama cutscenes compared to the regular gameplay. Navarro appraised the explosive car destruction as "one of the great joys of the game", although he noted some frame-rate drop in the GameCube version. Guzman commended the cutscenes as "admirably animated", but described the general visuals as "garish". Castaneda considered the presentation to be passable, elaborating that "The frame-rate is a tad buggy at times, but never during races, so it isn’t much of a bother. The character models fit the cast well enough, but it still doesn’t look that much better than the 32-bit version of the last game".

The audio was largely dismissed as unremarkable and forgettable, with the exception of Gibson, who praised the sound effects and music as "great" and "excellent". However, the voice-acting was more positively received. Navarro commended the comedic quality of the voice-acting in spite of its occasional obnoxiousness, and singled out the henchmen and "woefully underutilized" chicken commentators as "great fun". Castaneda was also impressed by the voice-acting, and claimed that the "clever writing and dynamite delivery will definitely make you laugh out loud a couple times". Guzman described the character banter as "rich, colorful, and amusing". Fisher felt that the voice work was merely decent, while Onyett found some of the character voices, particularly that of Pasadena O'Possum, to be annoying.

References

External links
 

2005 video games
Cancelled Nintendo DS games
Crash Bandicoot racing games
GameCube games
PlayStation 2 games
PlayStation Portable games
Racing video games
Universal Interactive games
Radical Entertainment games
Sierra Entertainment games
Vehicular combat games
Video games developed in Canada
Video games set in amusement parks
Xbox games
Kart racing video games
Multiplayer and single-player video games
Video games scored by Spiralmouth
Video games scored by Marc Baril